Charles Henry Ingersoll (October 29, 1865 – September 21, 1948), co-founded the Ingersoll Watch Company in 1892.

Biography
Ingersoll was born on October 29, 1865 in Delta, Michigan to Orville Boudinot Ingersoll and Mary Elizabeth Beers. His brother was Robert Hawley Ingersoll (1859-1928). He married Eleanor Ramsey Bond (1869-1928).

He co-founded the Ingersoll Watch Company in 1892. The company went bankrupt in 1921.

He switched to manufacturing fountain pens. In 1926 he converted his home in Montclair, New Jersey into a hotel.

He died on September 21, 1948 in West Orange, New Jersey. He was buried in Mount Hebron Cemetery in Upper Montclair, New Jersey.

References

External links

1865 births
1948 deaths
People from Eaton County, Michigan
People from Montclair, New Jersey
American manufacturing businesspeople
American watchmakers (people)
Fountain pen and ink manufacturers
Burials at Mount Hebron Cemetery (Montclair, New Jersey)